Orzechówek may refer to:

Orzechówek, Radomsko County, Poland
Orzechówek, Zgierz County, Poland